Kiliyur Falls is a waterfall on the Periyaaru river in the Shervaroyan hill range in the Eastern Ghats, Tamil nadu, India. The waters overflowing the Yercaud Lake fall  into the Kiliyur Valley.

See also
List of waterfalls in India
List of waterfalls in India by height

Notes

External links

Photos

Waterfalls of Tamil Nadu
Eastern Ghats
Tourist attractions in Salem district